Samuel Colman, also Samuel Coleman, (1780 – 21 January 1845) was an English painter, based  in Bristol for most of his career.

Life
In about 1815 Colman moved from Yeovil to Bristol, where he lived until around 1840. He  worked as a portrait painter and drawing-master in the city, as well as painting minutely detailed Romantic, Biblical and genre scenes.

He was a religious Nonconformist who worshipped at the Castle Green Independent Chapel and the Zion Chapel in Bedminster, and his faith was central to his work; some of his paintings, such as his The Destruction of the Temple (Tate Gallery), which shows the ruination of a Gothic cathedral, being criticisms of the Church of England. His apocalyptic paintings have drawn comparisons to those of  John Martin.

He signed works as Colman  and alternatively Coleman.

External links and references

1780 births
1845 deaths
19th-century English painters
English male painters
19th-century English male artists
Artists from Bristol
People from Yeovil